Olin Bailey Lewis (March 12, 1861 – March 28, 1936) was an American politician and educator.

Biography
Lewis was born on March 12, 1861, in Weyauwega, Wisconsin. In 1879, he graduated from Omro High School in Omro, Wisconsin. He graduated from the University of Wisconsin–Madison in 1884 and the University of Wisconsin Law School in 1889. In 1885, he married Della Barnett. They had three children. Lewis was a member of the Methodist Episcopal Church.

He died in Saint Paul on March 28, 1936.

Academic career
From 1884 to 1885, Lewis was a chemistry instructor at the University of Wisconsin–Madison. He went on to teach at various schools.

Political career
Lewis was a member of the Saint Paul Municipal Assembly from 1894 to 1898. Additionally, he was a Minnesota District Court judge. He was a Republican.

References

People from Weyauwega, Wisconsin
People from Omro, Wisconsin
Politicians from Saint Paul, Minnesota
Minnesota city council members
Minnesota Republicans
University of Wisconsin–Madison faculty
Schoolteachers from Wisconsin
Methodists from Wisconsin
19th-century Methodists
Minnesota lawyers
University of Wisconsin–Madison alumni
University of Wisconsin Law School alumni
1861 births
1936 deaths
Methodists from Minnesota